Timothy Paul Armstead (born February 26, 1965) is a Republican politician and jurist from West Virginia, currently serving as an associate justice of the Supreme Court of Appeals of West Virginia. He formerly represented 40th District (Kanawha County) in the West Virginia House of Delegates.  Armstead is originally from Clendenin, West Virginia.  He is a graduate of the University of Charleston and West Virginia University College of Law.

In 2015, Armstead became the first Republican Speaker of the House of Delegates in 84 years.

Education

Armstead received a Bachelor of Arts in Political Science and History from the University of Charleston and a Juris Doctor from West Virginia University College of Law.

Supreme Court of Appeals of West Virginia

On August 25, 2018 Governor Jim Justice appointed Armstead to fill the vacancy by the retirement of Menis Ketchum. He was sworn in on September 25, 2018.

He was subsequently elected to the seat on November 5, 2018, to complete the term ending on January 1, 2021.  He has stated that he will be a candidate for a full term of 12 years in the election to be held in May, 2020. He served as chief justice in 2020.

References

External links

|-

1965 births
21st-century American judges
21st-century American politicians
Chief Justices of the Supreme Court of Appeals of West Virginia
Living people
Republican Party members of the West Virginia House of Delegates
People from Kanawha County, West Virginia
Speakers of the West Virginia House of Delegates
University of Charleston alumni
West Virginia Republicans
West Virginia University College of Law alumni